The Tosefta (Jewish Babylonian Aramaic: תוספתא "supplement, addition") is a compilation of the Jewish oral law from the late 2nd century, the period of the Mishnah.

Overview
In many ways, the Tosefta acts as a supplement to the Mishnah (tosefta means "supplement, addition"). The Mishnah is the basic compilation of the Oral law of Judaism; according to the tradition, it was compiled in 189 CE. The Tosefta closely corresponds to the Mishnah, with the same divisions for sedarim ("orders") and masekhtot ("tractates"). It is mainly written in Mishnaic Hebrew, with some Aramaic.

At times the text of the Tosefta agrees nearly verbatim with the Mishnah. At others there are significant differences. The Tosefta often attributes laws that are anonymous in the Mishnah to named Tannaim. It also augments the Mishnah with additional glosses and discussions. It offers additional aggadic and midrashic material, and it sometimes contradicts the Mishnah in the ruling of Jewish law, or in attributing in whose name a law was stated.

Origins
According to the Talmud,  the Tosefta was redacted by Ḥiya bar Abba and one of his students, Hoshaiah. Whereas the Mishna was considered authoritative, the Tosefta was supplementary. The Talmud often utilizes the traditions found in the Tosefta to examine the text of the Mishnah.

The traditional view is that the Tosefta should be dated to a period concurrent with or shortly after the redaction of the Mishnah. This view pre-supposes that the Tosefta was produced in order to record variant material not included in the Mishnah.

Modern scholarship can be roughly divided into two camps. Some, such as Jacob N. Epstein, theorize that the Tosefta as we have it developed from a proto-Tosefta recension which formed much of the basis for later Amoraic debate. Others, such as Hanokh Albeck, theorize that the Tosefta is a later compendium of several baraitot collections which were in use during the Amoraic period.

More recent scholarship, such as that of Yaakov Elman, concludes that since the Tosefta, as we know it, must be dated linguistically as an example of Middle Hebrew 1, it was most likely compiled in early Amoraic times from oral transmission of baraitot. Shamma Friedman has found that the Tosefta draws on relatively early Tannaitic source material and that parts of the Tosefta predate the Mishnah.

Authority
Rabbi Sherira Gaon (987 CE), in a letter written to the heads of the Jewish community in Kairuan (Tunisia), discusses the authority of the Tosefta in relation to the Mishnah. There, he writes:

Rabbi Sherira Gaon then brings down the reverse of this example: "Or, let us suppose that Rebbe [Yehuda Ha-Nassi] in the Mishnah records a dispute between R. Meir and R. Yosi. However, R. Ḥiya prefers R. Meir's argument, and therefore records it in a Baraita without mentioning R. Yosi's opposing view. In such a case, we do not accept [R. Ḥiya's] decision."

Manuscripts, editions commentaries, and translations

Manuscripts
Three manuscripts exist of the Tosefta:
 'Vienna' (late 13th century; Oesterreichische Nationalbibliothek Cod hebr. 20; the only complete manuscript),
 'Erfurt' (12th century; Berlin - Staatsbibliothek (Preussischer Kulturbesitz) Or. fol. 1220), and,
 'London' (15th century; London - British Library Add. 27296; contains Seder Mo'ed only).

The Editio Princeps was printed in Venice in 1521 as an addendum to Isaac Alfasi's Halakhot.

All four of these sources, together with many Cairo Geniza fragments, have been published online by Bar Ilan University in the form of a searchable database.

Editions
Two critical editions have been published. The first was that of Moses Samuel Zuckermandl in 1882, which relied heavily on the Erfurt manuscript of the Tosefta. Zuckermandl's work has been characterized as "a great step forward" for its time. This edition was reprinted in 1970 by Rabbi Saul Lieberman, with additional notes and corrections.

In 1955, Saul Lieberman first began publishing his monumental Tosefta ki-Feshutah. Between 1955 and 1973, ten volumes of the new edition were published, representing the text and the commentaries on the entire orders of Zera'im, Mo'ed and Nashim. In 1988, three volumes were published posthumously on the order of Nezikin, including tractates Bava Kama, Bava Metzia, and Bava Batra. Lieberman's work has been called the "pinnacle of modern Tosefta studies."

Commentaries
Major commentaries on the Tosefta include those by:
 David Pardo: Chasdei David; Originally published in Livorno (1776), and printed in editions of the Vilna Shas.
 Yehezkel Abramsky: Hazon Yehezkel (24 volumes, 1925–1975 in Hebrew).
 Saul Lieberman: Tosefet Rishonim, Jerusalem 1937.
 Jacob Neusner and his pupils (in a series called A History of the Mishnaic Law, 1978–87)

Translations
The Tosefta has been translated into English by Rabbi Jacob Neusner and his students in the commentary cited abovenand was also published separately as The Tosefta: translated from the Hebrew (6 vols, 1977–86).

Eli Gurevich's English translation and detailed commentary on the Tosefta is in the progress of being written. It can be downloaded for free from his website Tosefta Online - English Translation and Commentary on the Tosefta by Eliyahu Gurevich.

See also
 Gemara
 Old Synagogue (Erfurt)
 Rabbinic literature

References

External links

 "TOSEFTA" in the Jewish Encyclopedia
 Tosephta in the Catholic Encyclopedia
 ToseftaOnline.org - A new free English translation, commentary and edited Hebrew text of the Tosefta, as well as MP3 shiurim (lectures) and various commentaries available for free download
 Full text at Mechon-Mamre
 Treasury of Talmudic Manuscripts, Jewish National and University Library
 Sacred Texts: gives a more detailed explanation of the origins of the Tosefta (in relation to the rest of the Mishna)

Talmud
Tosefta
Tannaitic literature
Sifrei Kodesh